The 2020–21 Arizona Coyotes season was the 42nd season for the National Hockey League (NHL) franchise that was established on June 22, 1979, the 25th season since the franchise relocated from Winnipeg following the 1995–96 NHL season, and the 49th overall, including the World Hockey Association years. This would have been the final year of the Coyotes being in the Pacific Division in the 2020–21 season before the new NHL expansion team the Seattle Kraken enters into the Pacific Division in the 2021–22 NHL season. However, on December 20, 2020, the league temporarily realigned into four divisions with no conferences due to the COVID-19 pandemic and the ongoing closure of the Canada-United States border. As a result of this realignment, the Coyotes played this season in the West Division and only played games against the other teams in their new division during the regular season.

On May 5, 2021, the Coyotes were eliminated from playoff contention after a 4–2 loss to the Los Angeles Kings.

Standings

Divisional standings

Schedule and results

Regular season
The regular season schedule was announced on December 23, 2020.

Draft picks

Below are the Arizona Coyotes' selections at the 2020 NHL Entry Draft, which was originally scheduled for June 26–27, 2020 at the Bell Center in Montreal, Quebec, but was postponed on March 25, 2020, due to the COVID-19 pandemic. The draft was held October 6–7, 2020 virtually via Video conference call from the NHL Network studio in Secaucus, New Jersey.

Draft notes

Notes

References

Arizona Coyotes seasons
2020–21 NHL season by team
2020 in sports in Arizona
2021 in sports in Arizona